Nitrosyl azide is a highly labile nitrogen oxide with chemical formula .

Synthesis 
Nitrosyl azide can be synthesized via the following reaction of sodium azide and nitrosyl chloride at low temperatures:

Properties 
Below −50 °C, nitrosyl azide exists as a pale yellow solid. Above this temperature, it decomposes into nitrous oxide  and molecular nitrogen :

Characterization of the compound with IR and Raman spectroscopy show absorption bands that agree well with calculated values for a trans-structure. Quantum chemical calculations show a cis-form higher in energy by 4.2 kJ/mol and an aromatic ring form that is more stable by 205 kJ/mol. However, the cyclization to the ring form would have to surpass the 205 kJ/mol activation energy barrier require to bend the azide group, which might explain why nitrosyl azide is stable enough to be isolated at low temperature.

References 

Azido compounds
Nitrosyl compounds
Nitrogen oxides